John Moultrie may refer to:

 John Moultrie (poet) (1799–1874), English clergyman, poet and hymn-writer
 John Moultrie (politician) (1729–1798), deputy governor of East Florida